Sierra Leone is a multilingual country. English is the official language, and Krio is the most widely spoken language among the different ethnic groups across Sierra Leone. 

Other major languages include Mende, which is spoken by 31% of the population as a mother tongue and is also widely spoken in the southern, and most of the Eastern part of Sierra Leone. Temne, which is spoken by 32% as a mother tongue, is also widely spoken in the northern province and the north Western province. Other languages include Kono, Kissi, Kuranko, Limba, Fula (Pular), Mandingo and Susu.

Although English, as the official language, is spoken in schools, government administration and the media, Krio is spoken as a lingua franca in virtually all parts of Sierra Leone. Krio, an English-based creole language, is the mother tongue of 10.5% of the population but is spoken by 90% of Sierra Leoneans.

See also
Sierra Leonean Sign Language

References